Neyasar (also Romanized as Niāsar, Nīāsar, and Nīyā Sar; also known as Nezār) is a city and capital of Neyasar District, in Kashan County, Isfahan Province, Iran.  At the 2006 census, its population was 2,003, in 586 families.
Neyasar is located in north west of Kashan in Isfahan Province. It is a Garden City because it was a small village and now it has become a city with many gardens. Neyasar is famous for Flower-Water Festival. This Festival begin in second week of Ordibehesht (first of May). In this festival people install pots and mixed flowers and water and then turn fire under pot after 13 hours steam of water moved to another container and then moved to the rose bottle.
Many people from all around of world and from Iran gathered in Neyasar to viewing this festival.

Archaeology
Middle Paleolithic stone tools have been discovered in travertine deposits close to spring that date back to more than 40.000 years ago. Niasar Fire Temple is a structure with a dome, above the spring of Niasar Village.  It is believed to have been built during the reign of Ardashir I, 224-242 CE.

References

http://www.niasar.com/index.php

Populated places in Kashan County
Cities in Isfahan Province